Carlos Taberner and Pol Toledo Bagué were the defending champions but chose not to defend their title.

Julian Ocleppo and Andrea Vavassori won the title after defeating Sergio Galdós and Federico Zeballos 6–3, 6–2 in the final.

Seeds

Draw

References
 Main Draw

San Benedetto Tennis Cup - Doubles
2018 Doubles